Mafutseni is a town in central Eswatini. It is located to the northeast of Manzini and Hhelehhele at the junction of the MR3 route to Mpaka and the MR5 route to Mpisi.

References
Fitzpatrick, M., Blond, B., Pitcher, G., Richmond, S., and Warren, M. (2004)  South Africa, Lesotho and Swaziland. Footscray, VIC: Lonely Planet.

Populated places in Manzini Region